Rothberg is a surname. Notable people with the surname include: 

Bob Rothberg (1901–1938), songwriter
Jonathan M. Rothberg (born 1963), American scientist and entrepreneur
Patti Rothberg (born 1972), American musician and artist
Künter Rothberg (born 1984), Estonian judoka

See also
Rothberg Institute For Childhood Diseases
Roșia, Sibiu Commune, Sibiu County, Romania

German-language surnames